Coprobacillus is a Gram-positive, obligate anaerobic and non-motile genus from the family of Erysipelotrichidae, with one known species (Coprobacillus cateniformis).

See also
 List of bacterial orders
 List of bacteria genera

References

Further reading 
 
 

Coprobacillaceae
Monotypic bacteria genera
Bacteria genera